Walter Conway (1872 – 1933) was the longstanding secretary of the Tredegar Medical Aid Society in South Wales. This society contributed the model which established the British National Health Service.

Personal life
John Walter Conway, to give him his full name, was born in November 1872 to Thomas Conway, iron puddler, and Mary Conway (née Thomas), in Plantation Street, Rhymney. He had one sibling, his brother Thomas, who was born four years later.

The 1881 census documents that Conway’s father had become a single parent, living with his two young sons in Tredegar, in the next valley. Perhaps his father decided to move to Tredegar to find work there. It had coal mines and an iron works, and was a boom town. While Conway was still a child, his father died. Consequently he was placed (with, presumably, his brother) in the care of the Bedwellty Union Workhouse, the town’s workhouse. The building was called 'Ty Bryn'. However, the workhouse was informally called 'The Spike’.

Conway described himself as a 'workhouse boy'. He obtained two benefits from his stay in the workhouse. First, from the Master, the formal head of the workhouse, he learnt the lesson 'to do everything well'. Second, he became acquainted with the world of books, which he described as being his best friends.

From 1891, Tredegar had had a Workmen's Institute Library that was run by the main employer in the town, the Tredegar Iron and Coal Company. It was financed by contributions that were deducted at source from the earnings of its employees and administered by a committee which comprised members from each of the Company’s coal mines. In 1900 Conway was one of the eight members for the library on the committee for the Pochin No. 1 Pit. (The name 'Pochin' comes from Henry Pochin, an English industrial chemist, who was one of the directors of the Company).

On 19 December 1898, Conway married Mary Elizabeth Morgan from Tredegar, who was three years his junior. His 'rank or profession' was 'coal miner'. They lived in Glyn Terrace, Tredegar. The couple had three daughters and one son. The eldest was Catherine Ann, who was born c.1900. The next eldest was Christina, who was born c.1902. The next eldest was Mary Elizabeth, who was born c.1904. The son died in the late 1980s. Catherine died when she was a young married woman. She is buried in what was then the new part of Cefn Golau Cemetery, Tredegar.

Conway became a mentor and teacher to the teenage Aneurin Bevan, like him a resident of Tredegar. Also, he helped Bevan to manage his stutter. The Medical Society was already employing doctors under its Medical Supertendant, but it went on to open offices and a dentists and a central surgery.

During the winter of 1920–1921, Conway, Bevan and other friends formed the Query Club, which was a radical debating society. 
Conway was a devout and very active Presbyterian. According to Bryant (1998), he was a deacon of his local chapel, where he and his family attended three services on Sundays. A photograph of a class of the Chapel Sunday school seen in Tredegar Museum shows him in the centre, doubtless as the teacher.

Public life 
In 1908, Conway was elected as a guardian on the Board of Guardians of the town’s workhouse, the Bedwellty Union Workhouse, in which capacity he served more than twenty years. Some of his colleagues on the Board of Guardians were members of the new Independent Labour Party (ILP), which had been established in Bradford in 1893. The party had members in many parts of south Wales. However, a branch of the party was established in the town much later than in other parts of south Wales, in 1911, which might have reflected the traditional allegiance of the local working class to the Liberal Party.

In April 1915, while employed as a haulier in one of the local collieries, Conway was elected chairman of Bedwellty Board of Guardians. Also in 1915, from more than fifty applicants, he was appointed Secretary of the Tredegar Medical Aid Society, which he had enthusiastically supported since at least 1909. He remained in office for the whole of his life. The following year, in addition to undertaking this role, he gave classes on social science under the auspices of the London-based Central Labour College (CLC), which had been established in 1909 with the financial help of the South Wales Miners' Federation. The motto of the College was "Agitate Educate Organise".

Conway was also a prominent trade union leader and occupied important positions in workmen's organisations. Doubtless it was because of his ability that he came to hold at least three prestigious positions in Tredegar. He was Chairman of both the Board of Guardians of Bedwellty Workhouse and the Assessment Committee of Bedwellty Union.

The Tredegar Medical Aid Society
Conway is most remembered as the Secretary of the Tredegar Medical Aid Society. He enabled the Society to provide medical services to twenty thousand local inhabitants. By 1925, The society purchased the redundant Palace cinema which they converted into an additional surgery as well as establishing space for their own dental mechanic. These surgeries liaised with the Tredegar General Hospital which had existed since 1904.

The Society employed Dr A. J. Cronin, who depicted it in his novel The Stars Look Down. Other similar societies existed in the South Wales valleys and England. However, inevitably Bevan drew upon his local society as a model when, as Minister of Health in the post-war Labour government, he created the National Health Service.

Legacy
By the time of Conway's death, the Tredegar Medical Aid Society was supplying the medical needs of 95% of the population. The Society was run by a committee of thirty members. However, its success was largely due to Conway's outstanding talents as a health administrator. At one stage, the Society employed five doctors, two dentists with a mechanic each, pharmacy dispensers and assistants and a nurse. Not only did the society see to the medical expenses but it also supplied good wages and conditions for its staff. The doctors were allowed some private work which again was a model followed within the National Health Service when it was established just over a decade after Conway died.

Conway has a street named after him in Tredegar. He died in February 1933 and is buried in what was then the new part of Cefn Golau Cemetery, Tredegar. A photograph of the lengthy funeral procession shows the mourners making their way on foot from the town up the hill to the cemetery. Conway never saw himself portrayed as "Owen" in the 1938 film The Citadel, which was based on Cronin's novel.

Documentary sources 
At present only three documentary sources about Conway are known to exist. The earliest source is an anonymous obituary of him, 'A romantic career  Death of Mr Walter Conway, Tredegar Workhouse Boy who became Chairman of Guardians  Unique Public Service', which was published in the Saturday 18 February 1933 edition of the Merthyr Express. The next source are brief anecdotes about Conway by Harold Finch, MP. in his 1972 Memoirs of a Bedwellty MP, published by the Starling Press, Risca, Newport. The other source is Chapter Three of The health of a nation  The history and background of the National Health Service with thoughts on its future by Kenneth M. Bryant (1998), which was published by the author.

References

1872 births
1933 deaths
Welsh socialists
People from Rhymney
People from Tredegar